Was It Bigamy? is a 1925 American silent drama film directed by Charles Hutchison and starring Edith Thornton, Earle Williams and Wilfred Lucas.

Synopsis
A woman marries twice, once for love and once for financial security to help out a relative. Technically she has committed bigamy, but questions remain how morally responsible she is for this illegal act.

Cast
 Edith Thornton as Ruth Steele
 Earle Williams as 	Carleton
 Tom Ricketts as 	Judge Gaynor 
 Charles Cruz as 	Harvey Gaynor
 Wilfred Lucas as Attorney

References

Bibliography
 Connelly, Robert B. The Silents: Silent Feature Films, 1910-36, Volume 40, Issue 2. December Press, 1998.
 Munden, Kenneth White. The American Film Institute Catalog of Motion Pictures Produced in the United States, Part 1. University of California Press, 1997.

External links
 

1925 films
1925 drama films
1920s English-language films
American silent feature films
Silent American drama films
American black-and-white films
Films directed by Charles Hutchison
1920s American films